Saurauia schultzeorum is a species of plant in the Actinidiaceae family. It is endemic to Ecuador.  Its natural habitat is subtropical or tropical moist montane forests. It is threatened by habitat loss.

References

Endemic flora of Ecuador
schultzeorum
Near threatened plants
Taxonomy articles created by Polbot
Taxa named by Hermann Otto Sleumer